The Estadio Revolución Mexicana is a multi-use stadium in Pachuca, Hidalgo, Mexico.  It is currently used mostly for football matches and is the home stadium for Garzas UAEH.  The stadium has a capacity of 3,500 people.

References

External links
Estadio Revolución Mexicana

Estadio Revolución Mexicana
Athletics (track and field) venues in Mexico
Pachuca
Sports venues in Hidalgo (state)